was a district located in Nagasaki Prefecture, Japan.

As of 2003, the district had an estimated population of 31,482 and a density of 244.41 persons per km2. The total area was 128.81 km2.

Towns and villages
 Iimori
 Konagai
 Moriyama
 Takaki

Merger
On January 4, 2005, the towns of Iimori, Konagai, Moriyama and Takaki were merged into the expanded city of Isahaya. Kitatakaki District was dissolved as a result of this merger.

References 

Former districts of Nagasaki Prefecture